Timung are one of the sub-clans (locally called Kur) from Tungjang Clan of Karbi community. They mainly live in Karbi Anglong, West Karbi Anglong and other parts of Northeast India.

References

Ethnic groups in Northeast India
Karbi Anglong district